Paragon Hospital, is a private, upscale, for-profit hospital in Kampala, Uganda's capital and largest city. It is one of the five upscale private tertiary care hospitals in the city.

Location
The geographical coordinates of Paragon Hospital are: 0°18'31.0"N, 32°37'37.0"E (Latitude:0.308611; Longitude:32.626944).

Overview
Paragon Hospital, is an urban, private, for-profit, upscale hospital that serves the population of Kampala and surrounding districts. It is one of the five private upscale hospitals in Uganda's capital city, Kampala. It aims to address the gap in specialized tertiary healthcare delivery in the country and to serve that segment of Uganda's population that has been seeking the missing services from outside Uganda. Paragon Hospital focuses on the provision of prenatal, intrapartum, post partum and fertility services.

History
Construction of the 400 bed facility began in 2004, with the first patients admitted in 2007. The construction budget was estimated at USh9 billion (approx. US$4 million in 2007 money). The hospital plans included a private  reservoir, a private underground water source, and an oxygen manufacturing facility.

See also
 International Hospital Kampala
Nakasero Hospital
Kampala Hospital
Hospitals in Uganda

References

External links
 Website of Paragon Hospital
 Full Woman Health Camp, A One-Stop Information Centre

Hospitals in Kampala
2007 establishments in Uganda
Hospitals established in 2007
Nakawa Division
Hospital buildings completed in 2007